Sporobolus aculeatus is a species of plants in the family Poaceae (true grasses).

References 

aculeatus